Benihana is a chain of Japanese-American restaurants.

Benihana may also refer to:
Benihana (skateboarding trick)